Saint-Sylvestre-sur-Lot (literally Saint-Sylvestre on Lot; Languedocien: Sent Salvèstre d'Òut) is a commune in the Lot-et-Garonne department in south-western France.

See also
Communes of the Lot-et-Garonne department

References

Saintsylvestresurlot